The Journal of Conservative Dentistry is an open-access peer-reviewed medical journal published by Medknow Publications on behalf of the Federation of Operative Dentistry (India). The journal publishes articles on the subject of operative dentistry and endodontics aiming at restoration and replacement of teeth.

The journal is indexed with EBSCO Publishing’s Electronic Databases and PubMed.

External links

Whitening Strips

Open access journals
Quarterly journals
English-language journals
Dentistry journals
Medknow Publications academic journals
Academic journals associated with learned and professional societies